Ujir may be,

Ujir language, language spoken in Aru Islands in eastern Indonesia

People
Masai Ujiri, English-born Nigerian basketball executive and former basketball player
Ujir Singh Thapa, Nepalese administrator and military officer

See also
Ujire, town in Karnataka, India